Sam Webb (born May 19, 1998) is an American football cornerback for the Las Vegas Raiders of the National Football League (NFL).

Professional career
Webb signed with the Las Vegas Raiders on April 30, 2022, following the 2022 NFL Draft. Webb made the initial 53-man roster out of training camp.

References

External links
Missouri Western Griffons bio
Las Vegas Raiders bio

Living people
Las Vegas Raiders players
Missouri Western Griffons football players
American football cornerbacks
1998 births